The Arizona Sports Hall of Fame is a sports hall of fame in the United States honoring any athlete who has "merited recognition and distinction in sports and who has brought fame and honor to the State of Arizona through outstanding sporting accomplishments or contributions." According to the hall's official website, individuals are eligible if he or she meets one of three criteria:
 A native of Arizona
 Immediately recognized as an Arizonian
 Has made at least two significant contributions in the athletic community in the State of Arizona
Additionally, the final say and responsibility of who is inducted belongs to the Arizona Sports Hall of Fame Trustee Board.

The hall was founded in 1957 by the Phoenix Press Box Association, and held induction ceremonies regularly until 2002, when it fell dormant. It was revitalized in 2009 by the Phoenix Regional Sports Commission, which owns and operates the hall to this day.

The 45th class, inducted on April 8, 2015, included Charles Barkley, Danielle Ammaccapane, Cotton Fitzsimmons, Joe Gilmartin, and Luis Gonzalez.

Inductees

References

External links

State sports halls of fame in the United States
All-sports halls of fame
Halls of fame in Arizona
Awards established in 1957
Hall of Fame